Aldford Hall is a farmhouse to the south of the village of Aldford, Cheshire, England.  It is recorded in the National Heritage List for England as a designated Grade II listed building.

The house was designed by John Douglas for Hugh Grosvenor, 1st Duke of Westminster as part of a model farm, and built between 1876 and 1881.  In about 1912 it was converted into two cottages with no alteration to its exterior.  The lower storey is built in red sandstone and the upper storey is built in brown brick with blue diapering and sandstone dressings.

See also

Listed buildings in Aldford
List of houses and associated buildings by John Douglas

References

Houses completed in 1881
Grade II listed houses in Cheshire
John Douglas buildings
1881 establishments in England